Finlay Gray (born 28 February 2002) is a Scottish footballer who plays for Scottish League Two club Dumbarton as a midfielder, in his first season for the club.

Club career

Early career

Dumbarton
On 9 July 2022, Dumbarton  announced that they had signed Gray from Broomhill on a free transfer following a trial period. Gray scored his first goal for the club in a 2-0 victory against Peterhead on his first start in July 2022. Gray scored his first goal in Scottish League Two against Annan Athletic in what became a 4-0 victory for Dumbarton, helping the club match their best league start to a season since 1959. The next week, Gray scored a solo goal in injury-time against Stenhousemuir, carrying the ball from deep in his own half to the opposition penalty area where he had his initial shot deflected by the keeper before scoring the rebound. Gray won the Dumbarton player of the month award for August 2022.

Personal life
Gray has supported Dumbarton since he was a child.

References 

2002 births
Living people
Scottish footballers
People from Cardross, Argyll and Bute
Scottish Professional Football League players
Dumbarton F.C. players
St Mirren F.C. players
Broomhill F.C. (Scotland) players
Lowland Football League players
Sportspeople from Argyll and Bute